Hurdal is a municipality in Akershus in Viken county, Norway.  It is part of the traditional region of Romerike.  The administrative centre of the municipality is the village of Hurdal.

Fjellsjøkampen is the highest hill in Akershus. The mountain Toppåsen is also located in the municipality.

General information

Name
The name (Old Norse: Urðardalr and Hurðardalr) is an old district name. (The name of the church site is Gjøing.) The first element is the genitive case of an old river name (later called Gjøingelva which means "Gjøing river"), probably Urð which means "stony river" (from urð which means "scree").  (The sideform Hurðardalr has an addition of a false /h/.)  The last element is dalr meaning "valley" or "dale".  Prior to 1918, the name was spelled "Hurdalen".

Coat-of-arms
The coat-of-arms is from modern times.  They were granted in 1988.   The arms are green with a yellow-colored cone from a Norway Spruce tree (Picea abies).

History
The parish of Hurdalen was established as a municipality on 1 January 1838 (see formannskapsdistrikt). The new municipality of Feiring was separated from Hurdal on 1 January 1870.

Attractions
 Holy Trifon Skete, an Eastern Orthodox monastery of Orthodox church in Norway (Saint Nicolas commune). The monastery was established in 1985.

Notable residents
 Børre Rognlien (born 1944 in Hurdal) a sports official and politician, former journalist and military officer
 Harald Sunde (born 1954 in Hurdal) a military officer, head of the Norwegian Armed Forces 2009 to 2013
 Robert Sørlie (born 1958 in Hurdal) - dog sled racer, winner of Iditarod Trail Sled Dog Race in 2003 and 2005
 Kjetil Mulelid (born 1991 in Hurdal) a Norwegian jazz pianist and composer

Gallery

References

External links

Municipal fact sheet from Statistics Norway

 
Municipalities of Akershus
Municipalities of Viken (county)
Villages in Akershus